Yombo is a village in the Bamingui-Bangoran prefecture in the northern Central African Republic. The village is home to a co-educational state school which had 467 pupils in 2003, however none of these students were indigenous. The Yombo village health center provides nursing and traditional healing services.

References

Populated places in Bamingui-Bangoran
Bamingui